Neospastis sinensis is a moth in the family Xyloryctidae. It was described by John David Bradley in 1961 and is found in China (Hongkong).

The larvae feed on Camellia sinensis.

References

Neospastis
Moths described in 1961